Mary Lathrap ( Torrans; April 25, 1838 - January 3, 1895), pen name: Lena; known as "The Daniel Webster of Prohibition", was a 19th-century American author, preacher, suffragist, and temperance reformer. For 20 years, she was identified with the progressive women of Michigan who had temperance, purity, and prohibition as their watchwords, and the white ribbon as their badge. A licensed preacher for the Methodist Episcopal Church (1871), she served as president of Michigan's Woman's Christian Temperance Union (1882), co-founded the state's suffrage organization (1870), and worked on the amendment campaign (1874). She died in 1895, aged 56.

Early life and education
Mary Torrans was born on a farm near Jackson, Michigan, on April 25, 1838. Her parents were Scotch-Irish Presbyterians. Lathrap's childhood was passed in Marshall, where she was educated in the public schools. She was a literary child, and at the age of 14, contributed to local papers under the pen-name "Lena." She was converted in her tenth year, but did not join the church until she was nearly 18 years old.

Career

From 1862 to 1864, she taught in the Detroit public schools. In 1864, she married Carnett C. Lathrap, then assistant surgeon of the Ninth Michigan Cavalry. In 1865, they removed to Jackson. There, she joined the Methodist Episcopal Church, of which her husband was a member, and became a speaker in the church classrooms. In 1871, she was licensed to preach the gospel and began in the Congregational Church in Michigan Center. Her sermons aroused the people, and for years, she labored as an evangelist, many thousands being converted by her ministry.

She took an active part in the Women's Crusade, was a co-founder of the Woman's Christian Temperance Union, and served as president of the State union of Michigan from 1882. Her work was largely devoted to that organization for at least eight years. She labored in various States and was a strong helper in securing the scientific-instruction law, and in the Michigan, Nebraska and Dakota Territory amendment campaigns. In 1878, she secured the passage of a bill in the Michigan legislature appropriating US$30,000 for the establishment of the Girls' Industrial Home, a reformatory school, located in Adrian. She was a contributing editor The Union Signal. In 1890, she was a member of the Woman's Council in Washington, D.C.

Her evangelistic and platform work consumed a major part of her life and effort, but her literary work was also important. Her poems were meritorious productions, and she wrote enough to fill a large volume. During the years of her great activity in evangelistic and temperance work, her literary impulses were over-shadowed by the moral work in which she was engaged. Later in life, she wrote more. Her memorial odes to James A. Garfield and John Bartholomew Gough were widely quoted, as were also many other of her poems. Her lectures were always successful, and she was equally at home on the temperance platform, on the lecture platform, in the pulpit or at the author's desk. Her oratory caused her to be styled "The Daniel Webster of Prohibition," a name well-suited to her.

Death
Mary Torrans Lathrap died January 3, 1895, aged 56.

Selected works
 What means this stone? : a poem, 1891
 The poems and written addresses of Mary T. Lathrap with a short sketch of her life ..., 1895 (with Alphonso A Hopkins; Lewis Ransom Fiske; Henry Somerset, Lady; Julia R Parish; Frances E Willard)
 No uncertain sound : Mary T. Lathrap, selections from her most recent speeches : dead, but yet she speaks., 1895
 Rare gems from the literary works of Mary T. Lathrap : born April 25, 1838, died January 3, 1895. 1895 (with Julia R Parish)

References

Attribution

Bibliography

External links
 
 
 

1838 births
1895 deaths
19th-century American women writers
19th-century American poets
19th-century American clergy
19th-century pseudonymous writers
American women poets
American Protestant ministers and clergy
American suffragists
Methodist Episcopal Church, South
People from Jackson, Michigan
Woman's Christian Temperance Union people
Pseudonymous women writers
Poets from Michigan
Wikipedia articles incorporating text from A Woman of the Century